Erika Guevara Rosas is a Mexican-American human rights lawyer and feminist, and the Americas Director at Amnesty International (AI), Prior to her tenure with AI, she was the Americas Director at the Global Fund for Women.

Education 
Guevara Rosas has a master's degree in Women's Studies, a Post-Graduate degree in Migration and Refugee Studies from York University, and her LLB from Universidad de Londres.

Affiliations 
In May 2015, Erika joined activist Christine Ahn, Nobel Peace Prize Laureates Leymah Gbowee and Mairead Maguire, and thirty other participants in a peace march across the demilitarized zone separating North and South Korea.

References

American human rights activists
Mexican human rights activists
Women human rights activists
Mexican women activists
Living people
American people of Mexican descent
Year of birth missing (living people)